Christian Matras (29 December 1903, Valence, Drôme, France - 4 May 1977, Paris) was a French cinematographer who worked on more than hundred feature films, including Grand Illusion (1937), directed by Jean Renoir; The Milky Way (1969), directed by Luis Buñuel; and Thérèse Desqueyroux (1962), directed by Georges Franju; Lola Montès (1955), The Earrings of Madame De... (1953), Le Plaisir (1952), La Ronde (1950), all directed by Max Ophüls;  and L'Aigle à deux têtes (1948) directed by Jean Cocteau.

Selected filmography
 Misdeal (1928)
 Billeting Order (1932)
 The Scandal (1934)
 The House on the Dune (1934)
 La Grande Illusion (1938)
 The Marvelous Night (1940)
 Paradise Lost (1940)
 Romance of Paris (1941)
 The Stairs Without End  (1943)
 Traveling Light (1944)
 Mademoiselle X (1945)
 The Idiot (1946)
 Once is Enough (1946)
 Eternal Conflict (1948)
 All Roads Lead to Rome (1949)
 The Paris Waltz (1950)
 La Rhonde (1950)
 Bluebeard (1951)
 Le Plaisir (1951)
 Imperial Violets (1952)
 The Earrings of Madame de... (1953)
 Madame du Barry (1954)
 Lola Montès (1955)
 Meeting in Paris (1956)A Kiss for a Killer (1957)
 Virginie (1962)
 The Bamboo Stroke (1963)
 The Lace Wars  (1965)
 The Desperate Ones (1967)
 La Voie Lactee (1969)
 Variety'' (1971)

External links
 

1903 births
1977 deaths
People from Valence, Drôme